This is a list of Development Regions of British Columbia as defined by StatsBC.

Regions
Cariboo Development Region
Kootenay Development Region
Mainland/Southwest Development Region
Nechako Development Region
North Coast Development Region
Northeast Development Region
Thompson-Okanagan Development Region
Vancouver Island/Coast Development Region

References

External links
WorkBC.ca map of Development Regions (BC Govt)

Development Regions